Vier Berge-Teucherner Land was a Verwaltungsgemeinschaft ("collective municipality") in the district Burgenlandkreis in Saxony-Anhalt, Germany. It was situated south of Weißenfels. The seat of the Verwaltungsgemeinschaft was in Teuchern. It was disbanded in January 2011.

The Verwaltungsgemeinschaft Vier Berge-Teucherner Land consisted of the following municipalities:

 Deuben 
 Gröben 
 Gröbitz 
 Krauschwitz 
 Nessa
 Prittitz 
 Teuchern
 Trebnitz

Former Verwaltungsgemeinschaften in Saxony-Anhalt